Argina amanda, the cheetah, is a moth in the family Erebidae. The species was first described by Jean Baptiste Boisduval in 1847.

Description
The uppersides of the forewings are orange, except the black markings with some white around them. The hindwings are orange too, with black spots on the edges. The undersides of the wings are very similar to the uppersides. The caterpillars feed on the young leaves and pods of Crotalaria species (Fabaceae).

Distribution
This species is widespread in tropical Africa (Angola, Cameroon, the Democratic Republic of the Congo, Ethiopia, the Gambia, Guinea, Ivory Coast, Kenya, Malawi, Mozambique, Nigeria, Somalia, South Africa, Tanzania, Uganda, Zambia and Zimbabwe) and in Madagascar.

References

 "Argina amanda, (Boisduval) Cheetah". African Moths. via - Internet Archive.
 "Argina amanda". ZipcodeZoo.com. via - archive.today.

External links
 "Alytarchia amanda: image 1". Flora of Zimbabwe.
 

Moths of Sub-Saharan Africa
Moths of Madagascar
Moths of Réunion
Nyctemerina
Moths described in 1847